Oasis Academy Arena  is  coeducational secondary school  located in the South Norwood in Greater London, England. It is part of Oasis Community Learning.

Description
Oasis Academy Arena is part of the Oasis Community Learning group, and evangelical Christian charity  The trust have guided forty schools out of special measures. 19 per cent of the 52 Oasis academies classified as failing. The trust's founder Reverend Steve Chalke says "Turning round a school is sometimes a quick fix, it really, truly is. And sometimes it’s a really long, hard, hard job".

Oasis has a long term strategy for enhancing the performance of its schools. Firstly it has devised a standard curriculum, that each school can safely adopt knowing it will deliver the National Curriculum. Secondly it has invested in staff training so they are focused on improving the outcomes for the students, and thirdly, through its Horizons scheme it is providing each member of staff and student with a tablet.

History
The school opened with one year group in September 2015, and moved into its newly built accommodation in September 2016, there were problems with the children who were described as lively. High powered senior staff were brought in in 2017. They found a school that was lacking in routines and a stable teaching force. In March 2018, Ofsted made its first visit and put the school in special measures. The Ofsted report  set a series of targets. Ofsted made a monitoring visit where it was positive about the reforms being made, and in November 2019 decided enough improvements had been made for it to come out measures.

Buildings
The school was built as part of the Olympic legacy, adjacent to the  Croydon Arena Athletics Track. The Project was managed by Willmot Dixon. This was a £20 m contract to build two teaching blocks, access roads and all-weather pitch. They started on site in April 2015 and completed in August 2016.

References

External links
 The school website
 Drone video of the school

Academies in the London Borough of Croydon
Secondary schools in the London Borough of Croydon
Arena